The Harry S Truman Bridge is a vertical lift rail drawbridge over the Missouri River connecting Jackson County, Missouri with Clay County, Missouri in Kansas City, Missouri. It has a 427 foot main span, and is the tenth longest span in the United States.

The bridge was named on May 23, 1945, for Jackson County native Harry S. Truman who had just become President.  It was built by the Chicago, Milwaukee, St. Paul and Pacific Railroad ("Milwaukee Road") and Chicago, Rock Island and Pacific Railroad ("Rock Island Line") and connected to the Kansas City Terminal Railway network through Kansas City.

It is now used by the freight trains of the Canadian Pacific and Union Pacific Railroad to cross the Missouri River.

See also
List of crossings of the Missouri River

External links
Kansas City Library history

Truman
Union Pacific Railroad bridges
Chicago, Milwaukee, St. Paul and Pacific Railroad
Chicago, Rock Island and Pacific Railroad
Canadian Pacific Railway bridges in the United States
Buildings and structures in Clay County, Missouri
Buildings and structures in Jackson County, Missouri
Railroad bridges in Missouri
Vertical lift bridges in Missouri